Process–architecture–optimization is a development model for central processing units (CPUs) that Intel adopted in 2016. Under this three-phase (three-year) model, every microprocessor die shrink is followed by a microarchitecture change and then by one or more optimizations. It replaced the two-phase (two-year) tick–tock model that Intel adopted in 2006. The tick–tock model was no longer economically sustainable, according to Intel, because production of ever smaller dies becomes ever more costly.

Roadmap

See also

List of Intel CPU microarchitectures

Notes

References

Intel x86 microprocessors
Technology strategy